Lenovo A526 is a dual-SIM, quad-core MediaTek Cortex A7 based smartphone launched on 2 April 2014. It released on April 5, 2014.

Design and features

The CPU is Mediatek Cortex A7 1.3 GHz quad-core processor. It has a 4.5 inch FWVGA screen with a resolution of 480x854 px.

RAM memory is 1 GB, internal eMMC memory size is 4 GiB. Additionally, the smartphone supports external microSD/microSDHC card of a capacity up to 32 GB.

The Li-Po battery capacity is 2000 mAh. Lenovo A526 is running Android 4.2, Jelly Bean operating system.

References

A526
Android (operating system) devices
Mobile phones introduced in 2014
Discontinued smartphones